The following is a Forbes list of Hong Kong billionaires is based on an annual assessment of wealth and assets compiled and published by Forbes magazine on April 6, 2021.

List

See also 
 Lists of billionaires
 List of countries by the number of billionaires
 List of Hong Kong people
 List of wealthiest families

References 

Lists of people by wealth
 
Economy of Hong Kong-related lists